Substrate is used in a converting process such as printing or coating to generally describe the base material onto which, e.g. images, will be printed.  Base materials may include:
 plastic films or foils, 
 release liner
 textiles, 
 plastic containers
 any variety of paper (lightweight, heavyweight, coated, uncoated, paperboard, cardboard, etc.), or 
 parchment.

Electronics

Printing processes such as silk-screening and photolithography are used in electronics to produce printed circuit boards and integrated circuits.  Some common substrates used are;
 Glass-reinforced epoxy, eg FR-4 board
 Ceramic-PTFE laminate, eg 6010 board
 Alumina ceramic
 Silicon
 Gallium arsenide
 Sapphire
 Quartz

References

Bibliography
 Rogers, John WM; Plett, Calvin, Radio Frequency Integrated Circuit Design, Artech House, 2010 .

Paper products
Printing
Publishing
Publications by format